The National Coordinating Committee to End the War in Vietnam was a US activist group that became an umbrella anti-Vietnam war group.  Members of this group convinced Senator Eugene McCarthy to run in the primaries against Lyndon B. Johnson as an anti-war primary candidate.

See also
List of anti-war organizations
List of peace activists
National Mobilization Committee to End the War in Vietnam

References 

Anti–Vietnam War groups
Political advocacy groups in the United States